Homer Eugene "Woody" Woodling (February 23, 1902 – September 14, 1984) was an athletics coach and administrator at Fenn College—now Cleveland State University. Woodling served two stints as the head men's basketball coach at Fenn College, from 1929 to 1941 and again from 1952 to 1953.  He also coached the Cleveland State baseball, track, tennis and golf teams.  Woodling served as Cleveland State's athletic director until 1966. He was the only athletic director that Fenn College had. He served in that position from 1929 to 1965 when Fenn College became Cleveland State. He was inducted into the Cleveland State Hall of Fame in 1975.

Woodling Gym on the Cleveland State campus is named after him. It is home to volleyball, wrestling, and fencing.

Personal life
Woodling was born to Charles Elwood Woodling and Elizabeth Beatrice Woodling (née Cotner). He married Frances R. Pinnell.

Head coaching record

Men's basketball

References

External links
 

1902 births
1984 deaths
Basketball coaches from Indiana
Cleveland State Vikings athletic directors
Cleveland State Vikings baseball coaches
Cleveland State Vikings men's basketball coaches
College golf coaches in the United States
College tennis coaches in the United States
College track and field coaches in the United States
People from Logansport, Indiana
Tennis coaches from Indiana